Martyr Lilu Mia (died 1971) was a freedom fighter of the Liberation War of Bangladesh. Bangladesh government awarded him the title of Bir Bikram for his bravery in the independence war.

Birth and education 
Martyr Lilu Mia's ancestral home is in Kandi village of Lokmankhar in Chhayasuti union of Kuliyarchar upazila of Kishoreganj district. His father's name is Sona Mia, mother is Sirennesa. He was married. His wife is Lalita Begum and they have two sons and two daughters.

Role and martyrdom in the liberation war 
The Bengali EPR troops of Thakurgaon Wing were perplexed. Because, at that time there were more than 120 non-Bengali army in that wing headquarters. Besides, there were some army soldiers there.

In the end, the call of patriotism won. On the night of 28 March (then clockwise 29 March), the Bengali EPR troops, including Lilu Mia, revolted. The clash between Bengali and non-Bengali EPRs in the wing lasted till March 30. Most of the non-Bengali EPR and Pakistani army (about 115) were killed in the clashes.

Then the EPR freedom fighters jumped into the war taking up positions in different places. One group formed defenses at Bhatgaon (23 miles before Thakurgaon), one at Deviganj, one at Shibganj. Apart from this, they also set up defenses at Khansama, Jaiganj and Jharbati on various roads connecting Thakurgaon and Syedpur.

During the war of resistance, the freedom fighters did not have field telephone or wireless communication with each other. As a result, there is difficulty in communication between them. Runner was the only means of communication. Then sometimes the responsibility of this work is given to the fearless and tactful Lilu Mia. He performed this duty with courage along with the war.

One day in the third week of April, Lilu Mia was going from one defence to another on a motorcycle while performing this duty. On the way, he was attacked by the Pakistan Army at a place named 10 miles on the Dinajpur-Saidpur road. There were defence of the freedom fighters at 10 miles. But the freedom fighters left the defensive position a few days ago after admitting a lot of casualties due to the heavy attack of the Pakistan army.

Meanwhile, the news of the freedom fighters from one defence to another has to reach through that area. Taking advantages of the leaving of freedom fighters in the area of 10 miles, the Pakistani army took place there. Occasionally, Pakistani helicopters fly in the sky in a short period. The responsibility of conveying the news fell on Lilu Mia. He did not give up not being even afraid. He went forward through that area without fear. But he did not succeed. The Pakistani army started firing at him. He was shot and fell to the ground. He gave his life doing his duty. He was martyred.

The body of martyr Lilu Miah could not be recovered by his comrades. Later his body was buried there by the local villagers. They did not mark the place for fear of Pakistani army. His comrades did not find his body after independence.

Career 
Martyr Lilu Mia was working in the 9th Wing (now Battalion) of Dinajpur EPR Sector in 1971. His rank was Lance Naik. Wing Headquarters is located in Thakurgaon town. He was posthumously awarded the title of Bir Bikram for his outstanding contribution in the war of liberation, especially as a runner. According to the Gazette of 1973, his Heroism Review Number is 114.

Awards and honors 

 Bir Bikram

Footnotes

References 

Bangladeshi activists
People of the Bangladesh Liberation War
Recipients of the Bir Bikrom
1971 deaths
Mukti Bahini personnel